James Shannon Dempsey (February 9, 1887 – October 24, 1955) was a Canadian politician who was a Member of Provincial Parliament in Legislative Assembly of Ontario from 1945 to 1955. He represented the riding of Renfrew South for the Ontario Progressive Conservative Party.

He was born in Calabogie, Ontario and was a contractor and lumberman. He died in office of a heart attack in 1955.

References

External links

1887 births
1955 deaths
Progressive Conservative Party of Ontario MPPs